The 2021 Mercer Tennis Classic was a professional women's tennis tournament played on outdoor hard courts. It was the ninth edition of the tournament which was part of the 2021 ITF Women's World Tennis Tour. It took place in Macon, Georgia, United States between 18 and 24 October 2021.

Singles main-draw entrants

Seeds

 1 Rankings are as of 4 October 2021.

Other entrants
The following players received wildcards into the singles main draw:
  Usue Maitane Arconada
  Hailey Baptiste
  Catherine Harrison
  Emma Navarro

The following player received entry using a protected ranking:
  Priscilla Hon

The following players received entry from the qualifying draw:
  Robin Anderson
  Hanna Chang
  Louisa Chirico
  Victoria Duval
  Allie Kiick
  Danielle Lao
  Whitney Osuigwe
  Alana Smith

Champions

Singles

  Madison Brengle def.  Zarina Diyas, 6–4, 4–6, 6–4

Doubles

  Quinn Gleason /  Catherine Harrison def.  Alycia Parks /  Alana Smith, 6–2, 6–2

References

External links
 2021 Mercer Tennis Classic at ITFtennis.com
 Official website

2021 ITF Women's World Tennis Tour
2021 in American tennis
October 2021 sports events in the United States
2021 in sports in Georgia (U.S. state)